Dark Shadows: The Book of Temptation is a Big Finish Productions audio drama based on the long-running American horror soap opera series Dark Shadows.

Plot 
Maggie Evans returns to Collinwood and finds herself the prey of supernatural forces...

Cast
Quentin Collins – David Selby
Angelique – Lara Parker
Willie Loomis – John Karlen
Maggie Evans – Kathryn Leigh Scott
Barnabas Collins – Andrew Collins
Charlotte Howell – Daphne Ashbrook
Voice – Ursula Burton
Voice – Kellie Ryan

External links
- Dark Shadows: The Book of Temptation

Book of Temptation
2006 audio plays
Works by Scott Handcock